Djene Kaba Condé (born in Kankan, Guinea) served as the First Lady of Guinea from 2010 until her husband Alpha Condé's overthrow during the 2021 Guinean coup d'état. She has three children.

Education
She studied at University Paris VII in France, Master of Information Science and Communication. She also has a degree in sociology. She worked for the agency of the Francophonie in Paris, and for ten years was advisor to employment and professional insertion ANPE-PARIS.

She began her primary studies at the school of Dramé Oumar in Kankan. After her admission to the CEP, she continued her schooling at Almamy College Samory Touré became high school Almamy Samory Touré for his secondary studies. Her admission to the BEPC still gives him the taste to continue his studies. Thus she will meet successively at the Lycée 2 August and 1 March in Conakry where she got the "Baccalaureate". Assiduous and brilliant, she will enter the Faculty of Social Sciences and Nature (FASSONA) of Donka, before winning Paris in 1984 to obtain a degree in Sociology at the prestigious university Jussieu Paris 7 and a master's degree in Sociology option "Information-Communication" with honors.

Djéné Kaba supports her dissertation thesis on the theme: Racism in the French press, a comparative study of three major dailies namely Le Monde, Le Figaro and Libération.

Professional background 
Immediately after graduating from university and her post-graduate studies, the young Djéné Kaba began working at the Agency for Cultural and Technical Cooperation (ACCT), now the Agence de la Francophonie, in Paris for 8 years under different responsibilities:
 Initially responsible for the publication of a technical newsletter for monitoring the activities of the Heads of State at the Summits of La Francophonie (drafting and dissemination in member countries);
 Assistant to the Director of Communications where she was responsible for the synthesis and drafting of the fact sheets and mission report; preparation and maintenance of a press kit;
 IT Manager and encoding of Human Resources file data.

She then took on the job of Employment Counselor at the National Employment Agency (ANPE), now called "Pole Emploi".

At this agency, Djéné Conde deals for several years mainly recruitment, linking (intermediation between supply and demand), implementation of job search methodologies and balance of personal and professional achievements . She is also minding

Political engagement 
Djéné Condé supports the Foundation for Maternal and Child Social Promotion (PROSMI), created in February 2011. The foundation undertakes action in several areas, including health, environment, women's empowerment and schooling girls.

References

Living people
First ladies of Guinea
People from Kankan
University of Paris alumni
Year of birth missing (living people)
Guinean expatriates in France